The 2013 AAA Texas 500 was a NASCAR Sprint Cup Series stock car race  held on November 3, 2013, at Texas Motor Speedway in Fort Worth, Texas, United States.

Summary
Contested over 334 laps, it was the thirty-fourth, and the eighth race in the Chase for the Sprint Cup during the 2013 NASCAR Sprint Cup Series season. Jimmie Johnson of Hendrick Motorsports won the race, his sixth win of the season, while Dale Earnhardt Jr. finished second and Joey Logano finished third.

Kyle Busch, Jimmie Johnson and Matt Kenseth were considered the most likely to win this race according to the pundits while Brad Keselowski, Elliott Sadler and Juan Pablo Montoya were considered the extreme underdogs. Some of the racing experts predicted that Jeff Gordon, Denny Hamlin and Greg Biffle would initially make great lap times during the race but would ultimately falter in the end.

Before the race, the championship lead would be split between Kenseth and Johnson. With three racing remaining, it looked like a tiebreaker would have been needed if the stalemate had carried over into Homestead-Miami.

Top ten finishers

References

AAA Texas 500
AAA Texas 500
AAA Texas 500
2010s in Fort Worth, Texas
NASCAR races at Texas Motor Speedway